Claus Norreen (born 5 June 1970) is a Danish musician, songwriter and record producer known for being a part of the band Aqua, which sold around 33 million records. He left the band in September 2016 to take on other musical ventures.

Biography

Claus Norreen was born in Charlottenlund, near Copenhagen. One of his biggest interests was electropop music.Hence, he bought a keyboard and started playing industrial techno.

When he finished school he started to work in his sisters' clothing store. The work in the store inspired him and influenced his style of music. In 1989, he met Søren Rasted and moved his music instrument to his residence.

Claus married Danish journalist Siggy Norreen (née Madsen) in 2001. Their son Elliott was born in February 2003. The couple have since separated.

Discography

Aqua albums
 Aquarium (1997)
 Aquarius (2000)
 Megalomania (2011)

Albums
Frække Frida Og De Frygtløse Spioner (1994, various artists)

Singles
 "Submerged" (1992) (Aeroflot)
 "Itzy Bitzy Spider" (1995) (Joyspeed)

Remixes
 "In my mind" (Danny Red Remix) (1998) (Antiloop)
 "Living in your head" (Aeroflot Remix) (2000) (Soundlovers)
 "Forever" (Aeroflot & Feindflug Remix) (2003) (Bruderschaft)
 "Facts of life" (Danny Red Remix) (2004) (LazyB)

Remix versions
 Aeroflot – "Submerge" (4:18)
 Antiloop – "In my mind" (Danny Red Remix) (3:27)
 Bruderschaft – "Forever" (Aeroflot & Feindflug Remix) (5:55)
 LazyB – "Facts of life" (Danny Red Mix Edit) (3:20)
 LazyB – "Facts of life" (Danny Red Remix) (5:29)
 LazyB – "Facts of life" (Danny Red vs. Claus Noreen Mix) (4:01)
 Soundlovers – "Living in your head" (Aeroflot Mix) (5:00)
 Soundlovers – "Living in your head" (Aeroflot Radio) (3:19)
 Soundlovers – "Living in your head" (Aeroflot Remix) (4:50)

References

External links
 Danny Red

1970 births
Living people
Aqua (band) members
Danish record producers
Danish pop musicians
Danish keyboardists
Pop keyboardists
Danish dance musicians
People from Gentofte Municipality